Matt Spanos (born December 31, 1984) is a former Canadian and American football guard. He played college football at Southern California.

Early years
Spanos graduated from Corona High School where he played on the defensive line as well.

College career
Spanos played all thirteen games as a redshirt sophomore. He would have started in 2006 as an offensive tackle but was academically ineligible. 

Spanos started nearly every game (he only missed the first three due to an injury) at center He was selected for the Pacific-10 Conference honorable mention team.

Professional career

Pre-draft
He was invited to the 2008 NFL Combine.

Miami Dolphins
He signed a free agent contract with the National Football League's Miami Dolphins on May 19, 2008. However, he was waived by the Dolphins during final cuts on August 30 and spent the season out of football.

Dallas Cowboys
Spanos was signed to a future contract by the Dallas Cowboys on January 12, 2009. He was waived on July 2, 2009.

San Francisco 49ers
Spanos was signed by the San Francisco 49ers on July 31, 2009. He was later released by the team on September 5, 2009

Hamilton Tiger-Cats
On October 20, 2009, Spanos was signed by the Hamilton Tiger-Cats of the Canadian Football League, and added to their practice roster. He was released on June 24, 2010.

References

External links
USC Trojans bio

Players of American football from California
American football offensive guards
American football centers
USC Trojans football players
Miami Dolphins players
Dallas Cowboys players
San Francisco 49ers players
Sportspeople from Corona, California
1984 births
Living people
Arizona Rattlers players
Omaha Nighthawks players
Sacramento Mountain Lions players
San Jose SaberCats players
Orlando Predators players
Los Angeles Kiss players